The Kakhaberidze, archaically Kakhaberisdze (pl. -ebi) (literally "the sons of Kakhaber") was a noble family in medieval Georgia which held sway over the highland northwestern Georgian province of Racha from the 11th or 12th century to the 13th. The Kakhaberidze were a branch of the Liparitid-Baguashi, their dynastic name being derived from its early member Kakhaber known from a few inscriptions from Racha.

By 1184, when Queen Tamar of Georgia ascended the throne, the Kakhaberidze had been in possession of both Racha and the neighboring district of Takveri, bearing the title of "Duke of Dukes" (eristavt-eristavi). Kakhaber (II) Kakhaberidze was the one who, together with Archbishop Anton of Kutaisi, placed the crown upon Tamar's brow at a ceremony held at the Gelati Monastery. His descendant and probably a grandson, Kakhaber (III), was powerful enough to defy the royal authority and play King David VI and his Mongol overlords against one another. By c. 1278, Kakhaber had been defeated, blinded and exiled at the king's order. His possessions were turned over to the crown. The Kakhaberidze seem to have retained themselves in Racha into the early 15th century, but then went in obscurity. Their descendants, the house of Chichua (ჩიჩუა) became a prominent family in the western Georgian region of Mingrelia while the house of Chijavadze (ჩიჯავაძე) (another branch of Kakhaberidze), continued to play an important role in the western Georgian kingdom of Imereti and both noble houses were confirmed as the princes (knyaz) under the Russian rule in the 19th century.

See also 

House of Chichua
House of Chijavadze

References 

Noble families of Georgia (country)
Georgian-language surnames